Labeo boulengeri is a fish in genus Labeo, a genus of carp. Like most fish of its genus, it is a generally tropical fish. It inhabits the Uebi Scelebi river of Ethiopia.  It has a maximum length of 22.5 cm.

References 

 

Endemic fauna of Ethiopia
Labeo
Fish described in 1912